Ivory is the ninth album by the American singer-songwriter Teena Marie, released on July 17, 1990. It was her last album for Epic Records. Marie supported the album with a North American tour.

The album reached No. 27 on the US Black Albums chart and No. 132 on the Billboard 200 (her lowest-placing album on both charts up to that date). Two singles from the album, "If I Were a Bell" and "Here's Looking at You", performed respectably on the Black Singles chart, peaking at No. 8 and No. 11 respectively. "Since Day One"  reached No. 69 in the UK, Marie's highest charting single in that country since "I Need Your Lovin'" ten years previously.

Production
The album was produced primarily by Marie; she considered it to have a rawer sound than previous albums. "Since Day One" was produced by Jazzie B of Soul II Soul. Marie and Michael Bivins rapped on "Here's Looking at You".

Critical reception

The Los Angeles Times noted that "longtime fans should find the title cut inviting—it resembles one of those I-am-womanhood-personified poems that Nikki Giovanni used to write back in the early '70s." The Chicago Tribune wrote that "the ballads ... are crushed beneath the weight of Marie's tedious new age philosophizing." The Los Angeles Daily News deemed Ivory "another singular collection of soul ballads and rhythmic dance numbers."

Track listing

Charts

Weekly charts

Year-end charts

References

External links
 Ivory on Discogs

Teena Marie albums
1990 albums
Epic Records albums